Felipe Ignacio Saavedra Saavedra (born 26 September 1996) is a Chilean professional footballer who plays as a left back for Primera B de Chile club Universidad de Concepción.

External links
 Profile at San Luis
 

1996 births
Living people
People from Quillota
Chilean footballers
Association football defenders
San Luis de Quillota footballers
Universidad de Chile footballers
Curicó Unido footballers
Deportes Iquique footballers
Universidad de Concepción footballers
Chilean Primera División players
Primera B de Chile players